Vincent Matthews may refer to:

 Vincent Matthews (athlete) (born 1947), American Olympian
 Vincent Matthews (footballer) (1896–1950), England international footballer
Vince Matthews, former vocalist in Dying Fetus

See also
Vincent Mathews (1766–1846), US Congressman from New York
Vincent R. Mathews (born 1912), Wisconsin politician